Geotrichum candidum is a fungus which is a member of the human microbiome, notably associated with skin, sputum, and faeces where it occurs in 25–30% of specimens.  It is common in soil and has been isolated from soil collected around the world, in all continents.

G. candidum is the causative agent of the human disease geotrichosis, the plant disease sour rot which infects citrus fruits, tomatoes, carrots, and other vegetables.  It can affect harvested fruit of durians such as Durio graveolens.

G. candidum is used widely in the production of certain dairy products including rind cheeses such as Camembert, Saint-Nectaire, Reblochon, and others. The fungus can also be found in a Nordic yogurt-like product known as viili where it is responsible for the product's velvety texture.

In a 2001 study, G. candidum was found to consume the polycarbonate found in CDs. This effect was later replicated in 2021.

History

Taxonomy
The genus Geotrichum was described by Johann Heinrich Friedrich Link in 1809 to accommodate the species G. candidum found on decaying leaves. Since then, over 130 taxa have been described in the genus, and hundreds of synonyms have been generated. For example, G. candidum was misclassified as the Oidium lactis in much early literature. Species of Geotrichum resemble the genera Trichosporon and Protendomycopsis; however, Geotrichum is of ascomycetous affiliation whereas the latter are members of the Basidiomycota. Species of Geotrichum are occasionally mistaken for fast growing members of the genus Dipodascus, which are characterized by irregularly branched, 10–14 μm wide hyphae and the production of single-spored asci. However, unlike Geotrichum, members of the genus Dipodascus lack dichotomous branching of the peripheral hyphae and their growth rates are generally less than 3 mm per day.

Phylogeny
Galactomyces candidus, formerly thought to be a distinct taxon, was found to be the sexual state of G. candidum using sequence-based methods Geotrichum candidum in the broad sense comprises 3 clades, corresponding to the species G. candidum, G. clavatum and G. fici, all of which are thought to have pathogenic potential. Species of Geotrichum can be differentiated by sequence analysis of the nuclear ribosomal large subunit (18S ribosomal RNA) or the internal transcribed spacer region of the nuclear ribosomal RNA gene.

Morphology

Anamorph
G. candidum colonies are thin, spreading, soft, creamy and white in the anamorph state. The fungus G. candidum is characterized by hyphae that appear creeping, mostly submerged and septatee. The hyphae colour appears to be hyaline or lightly pigmented. When the hyphae becomes airborne it changes shape from arthroconidia to cylindrical or barrel-shaped or ellipsoidal. Chlamydospores are subglobose, solitary, borne on undifferentiated hyphae. Blastoconidia sometimes develop on hyphae laterally. Conidia appear arthrosporous, terminal or intercalary, aerial on an agar surface. The conidia size ranges from 4.8 to 12.5 μm x 2.4–2.5 μm.

Teleomorph
G. candidum is thought to be homothallic but most isolates are self-sterile. Sexual reproduction was first observed in strains isolated from soils in Puerto Rico. The fungus produces globose asci that contain a single, thick walled, uninucleated, globose to oval ascospore measuring 6–7 μm by 7–10 μm. The ascospores have a smooth inner wall and a furrowed outer wall. The septa are perforated by microspores, arranged in a ring structure. The colonies appear to be growing faster in the sexual stage than the asexual stage.

Growth
Geotrichum candidum forms a fast growing colony that can grow to 5–6 cm diameter at 5 days on Sabouraud-glucose agar, wort agar and synthetic media. Microscopically, the growth is characterized by the production of dichotomously branched hyphae that resemble tuning forks along the colony margin. The condial chains become aerial, erect or decumbent and measure 6–12(−20) x 3–6(−9) μm. The fungus can grow on a variety of citrus fruits and cause Sour Rot. The conidia are colourless and have a slimy coating. G. candidum is also found occasionally in the human gut, feces, sputum and on skin. The temperature range changes depending on the surface that the fungus grows on. Fungal growth can be supported by D-glucose, D-mannose, D-xylose, L-sorbose, D-fructose, D-galactose, sucrose, D-mannitol, D-sorbital, ethanol and glycerol. Sporulation often requires a balance of carbon and nitrogen.

Distribution
G. candidum is extremely common in soil and has been isolated from substrates in Canada, United States, Britain, Germany, Austria, India, South Africa, Japan, Brazil and Peru. It is also found as a causal agent in sour rot in citrus fruits— a soft rot associated with the emission of a fruity odour. The fungus is also known as a post-harvest spoilage agent of muskmelon, squash and cucumber.

It is a naturally occurring colonist of certain dairy products particularly cheeses and is sometime used to inoculate wash-rind and bloomy rind cheeses.

Commercial uses
G. candidum can be used commercially to inoculate wash-rinds and bloomy rind cheeses. Cultures can be added to milk, brine or sprayed onto cheese surface. The optimum pH range for growth on cheese ranges from 4.4 to 6.7. The fungus colonizes nearly the entire surface of the cheese during the early stages of ripening. It is found on soft cheeses like Camembert cheese and semi-hard cheese Saint-Nectaire and Reblochon. For the Camembert cheese the fungi grows on the outside of the cheese forming a rind. The fungus is responsible for the uniform, white, velvety coat on Saint-Marcellin cheese. Lipases and proteases from G. candidum release fatty acids and peptides that provide the cheese with distinctive flavors. G. candidum reduces the bitterness in Camembert cheese through the activity of the aminopeptidases that hydrolyze low molecular weight hydrophobic peptides. Aminopeptidases also contributes an aroma in traditional Norman Camembert. The fungus also neutralizes the curd by catabolizing lactic acid produced by bacteria. G. candidum prepares the cheese for colonization of other acid sensitive bacteria such as Brevibacterium. The fungus inhibits growth of the bacteria Listeria monocytogenes. Commercial strains of G. candidum are available for cheese ripening.

See also
 Organisms breaking down plastic

Literature

References

External links 
 Mycology Online, University of Adelaide, South Australia
 Andreas Späth et al. : X‑ray microscopy reveals the outstanding craftsmanship of Siberian Iron Age textile dye, In: Nature Scientific Reports; (2021) 11:5141. doi:10.1038/s41598-021-84747-z. See also:Scientists solve mystery behind world's oldest 'Pazyryk' carpet. Daily Sabah, Istanbul, Mar 23, 2021 on Pazyryk carpet.

Further reading
 Domsch, K.H., W. Gams, and T.H. Anderson (1980) Compendium of Soil Fungi Volume 1, Academic Press, London, UK

Saccharomycetes
Fungal plant pathogens and diseases
Fungal citrus diseases
Animal fungal diseases
Organisms breaking down plastic
Fungi described in 1809